Hai-Tang is a 1930 British-German drama film directed by Richard Eichberg and Jean Kemm and starring Anna May Wong, Marcel Vibert and Robert Ancelin. It was made at Elstree Studios as the French-language version of The Flame of Love, which also starred Anna May Wong. A separate German version (The Road to Dishonour) was also released. Such multiple-language versions were common during the early years of sound before dubbing became more widespread.

Synopsis
In the Russian Empire, a young officer and a powerful Grand Duke both fall in love with a Chinese woman.

Cast
 Anna May Wong as Hai-tang  
 Marcel Vibert as Le grand duc 
 Robert Ancelin as Boris Ivanoff  
 Armand Lurville as Le colonel Mouraview  
 Hélène Darly as Yvette  
 François Viguier as Viguier  
 Gaston Dupray as Pierre Baron, le chanteur  
 Claire Roman 
 Mona Goya
 Gaston Jacquet

References

Bibliography
 St. Pierre, Paul Matthew. E.A. Dupont and his Contribution to British Film: Varieté, Moulin Rouge, Piccadilly, Atlantic, Two Worlds, Cape Forlorn. Fairleigh Dickinson University Press, 2010

External links

1930 films
British drama films
1930 drama films
1930s French-language films
Films shot at British International Pictures Studios
Films directed by Richard Eichberg
Films directed by Jean Kemm
French multilingual films
Films set in Russia
Films set in the 1900s
German drama films
German black-and-white films
British black-and-white films
British multilingual films
German multilingual films
1930 multilingual films
1930s British films
1930s German films